Henryk Szlązak (3 March 1913 – 30 September 1944) was a Polish wrestler. He competed in the men's Greco-Roman featherweight at the 1936 Summer Olympics. He was killed in the Warsaw Uprising during World War II.

References

1913 births
1944 deaths
Polish male sport wrestlers
Olympic wrestlers of Poland
Wrestlers at the 1936 Summer Olympics
Sportspeople from Warsaw
People from Warsaw Governorate
Polish civilians killed in World War II
Warsaw Uprising insurgents
Resistance members killed by Nazi Germany